This list of mines in Nova Scotia, Canada is subsidiary to the list of mines and list of mines in Canada articles. This list includes working, defunct and future mines in the country and is organised by the primary mineral output. For practical purposes stone, marble and other quarries may be included in this list.

Coal

Gold

Abandoned Mines 
The Nova Scotia Department of Natural Resources created the Abandoned Mine Openings Database, which is an inventory of abandoned mine workings from both underground operations and advanced exploration in the province. In the database, over 600 mining areas have been identified, consisting of over 7,000 shafts, adits, slopes, trenches, and associated underground workings which are or once were open to the surface. The database is updated regularly whenever locations are visited, or new mine openings are identified. The inventory can be filtered by mine opening name, mine opening type, location, claim, reference map, landowner type, commodity mined, county, name of vein or seam, hazard degree and by mine opening original depth.

The Nova Scotia Department of Natural Resources created the Abandoned Mine Openings Remediation Program in 2001 which has a budget of $50,000 a year to remediate openings that are located mainly on crown land, of which there are 2000. The Geoscience and Mines Branch of the Department of Natural Resources carries out regular inspections of the openings. This is managed on a three-year cycle in which almost every abandoned mine opening on crown land is inspected and assigned a degree of hazard. The hazard ratings range from Type I (inescapable) to Type IV (no significant hazard) and the openings are remediated in order of safety hazard. Closing all of the Type I abandoned mine openings on Crown land was the top priority of the Abandoned Mine Openings Remediation Program and was accomplished by the end of 2011. Remediation is completed by means of back-filling, fencing or placement of concrete caps over the mine opening. As deforestation and urban development increase, abandoned mines have become an important source of habitat for a number of bat species. Thus, the closure of abandoned mine openings presents a potential threat to bat populations. In response, habitat surveys have become an essential part of abandoned mine assessments. Should the area be deemed important for habitat preservation, the method of closure will be designed to suit the resident species.

From 2001 to 2015, approximately $810,000 was spent remediating hazardous openings on crown land. As of 2015, all 40 Type I abandoned mine openings and approximately 40% of Type II openings on crown land have now been remediated.

In 2019, the Auditor General of Nova Scotia identified a significant control weakness relating to the Department of Lands and Forestry’s financial reporting of abandoned mine sites. The Department of Lands and Forestry had not completed adequate investigations at all abandoned mine sites which were identified to have possible areas of contamination. Unidentified potential contaminants may result in ecological or human health concerns. Further investigation is ongoing.

References

Nova Scotia